Actinidine is an iridoid produced in nature by a wide variety of plants and animals. It was the first cyclopentanoid monoterpene alkaloid to be discovered. It is one of several compounds that may be extracted from the valerian (Valeriana officinalis) root and silver vine (Actinidia polygama), as well as several types of insects in the larval and imaginal stages. Actinidine is a cat attractant, with effects like those of nepetalactone, the active compound found in catnip.

Certain species of stick insects, including Megacrania batesii and Megacrania tsudai, possess a chemical defense mechanism which involves the secretion of an actinidine-containing substance from the prothoracic glands, when threatened by a predator.

Biosynthesis
A potential biosynthesis of actinidine from -citronellal is shown below.

References

Pyridine alkaloids
Cat attractants
Insect pheromones